Davoud Haghi (born 26 January 1981) is an Iranian football player. He was Iran Pro League best assist in 2007–08 season.

Club career
Haghi has played for Esteghlal Ahvaz in the Iranian Premier League.

Club career statistics

 Assist Goals

References

Iranian footballers
1981 births
Living people
Rah Ahan players
Saba players
Esteghlal Ahvaz players
Niroye Zamini players
Zob Ahan Esfahan F.C. players
Persian Gulf Pro League players
Association football midfielders